Friedrich Moch (born 12 April 2000) is a German cross-country skier.

He participated in the pursuit event at the FIS Nordic World Ski Championships 2021.

Cross-country skiing results
All results are sourced from the International Ski Federation (FIS).

Olympic Games

Distance reduced to 30 km due to weather conditions.

World Championships
1 medal – (1 bronze)

World Cup

Season standings

Individual podiums
 1 podium – (1 )

References

External links

2000 births
Living people
German male cross-country skiers
Cross-country skiers at the 2022 Winter Olympics
Olympic cross-country skiers of Germany
People from Memmingen
Sportspeople from Swabia (Bavaria)
FIS Nordic World Ski Championships medalists in cross-country skiing